Pedro Galindo Nieto, known as Pete Nieto (born c. 1941), is an attorney in Uvalde, Texas, who served a single term in the Texas House of Representatives in the former District 43 from 1993 until 1995. Nieto switched parties from Democrat to  Republican in June 1993 after the close of that year's regular legislative session.

In addition to his own Uvalde, District 43 included Dimmit, Frio, La Salle, Medina, Webb, and Zavala counties.

Nieto was defeated for a second term in 1994 by the Democrat Tracy King of Batesville. King received 15,072 votes (61.8 percent) to Nieto's 9,321 (38.2 percent).

King still holds the House seat, now numbered District 80 in an altered configuration.

References

External links
Texas Tribune article on 1992 election
Texas Legislative Reference library

Members of the Texas House of Representatives
Texas Democrats
Texas Republicans
1941 births
Living people
Texas lawyers
People from Uvalde, Texas
American politicians of Mexican descent